is a railway station in the city of Kasugai, Aichi Prefecture, Japan, jointly operated by Central Japan Railway Company (JR Tōkai) and the Aichi Kanjō Railway (Aikan).

Lines
Kōzōji Station is served by the Chūō Main Line, and is located 372.9 kilometers from the starting point of the line at Tokyo Station and 24.0 kilometers from Nagoya Station. It is also the northern terminus of the Aichi Loop Line and is 45.3 kilometers from the southern terminus at Okazaki Station.

Station layout
The station has three elevated island platforms with the station building underneath. The station building has automated ticket machines, TOICA, Manaca, Suica and PASMO automated turnstiles and a staffed ticket office.

Platforms

Adjacent stations

Station history
Kōzōji Station was opened on 25 July 1900. Along with the division and privatization of JNR on 1 April 1987, the station came under the control and operation of the Central Japan Railway Company. The Aichi Loop Railway began operations from 31 January 1988.

Passenger statistics
In fiscal 2017, the JR portion of the station was used by an average of 20,256 passengers daily (arriving passengers only) and the Aichi Loop Railway portion by 10,872.

Surrounding area
site of Shirayama Castle 
 Kōzōji New Town

See also
 List of railway stations in Japan

References

External links

JR official home page 
Aikan home page 

Railway stations in Japan opened in 1900
Railway stations in Aichi Prefecture
Chūō Main Line
Stations of Central Japan Railway Company
Kasugai, Aichi